George de la Poer Beresford, 1st Marquess of Waterford, KP, PC (Ire) (8 January 1735 – 3 December 1800) was an Irish politician, known as George Beresford, 2nd Earl of Tyrone from 1763 to 1789.

Early life
Beresford was the eldest suriving son of Marcus Beresford, 1st Earl of Tyrone and his wife, Lady Catherine Power, suo jure Baroness de la Poer. Among his siblings were John Beresford (who married Countess Anne Constantin de Ligondes), and William Beresford, 1st Baron Decies (who married Elizabeth FitzGibbon, sister of John FitzGibbon, 1st Earl of Clare).

His mother was the only daughter of James Power, 3rd Earl of Tyrone (who was also the 8th Baron Power) and the former Anne Rickard (eldest daughter and co-heiress of Andrew Rickard, of Dangan-Spidoge). His father was the only son of Sir Tristram Beresford, 3rd Baronet, and his wife Nichola Sophia Hamilton (youngest daughter of Hugh Hamilton, 1st Viscount of Glenawly).

He was educated at Kilkenny College and Trinity College, Dublin.

Career
From 1757 to 1760, he was a Member of the Irish House of Commons for Waterford County from 1757 to 1760, and for Coleraine from 1761 until 1763, when he inherited his father's earldom, entered the Irish House of Lords and was admitted to the Privy Council of Ireland.

He was Governor of Waterford from 1766 and custos rotulorum of that county from 1769 to 1800, during which time he was made a Knight of St Patrick, created Baron Tyrone in the Peerage of Great Britain in 1786, and elevated as a marquess in 1789.

Personal life
On 19 April 1769, he married Elizabeth Monck, the daughter of Henry Monck, of Charleville, and the former Lady Isabella Bentinck (second daughter of Henry Bentinck, 1st Duke of Portland). Elizabeth was also the cousin of Charles Monck, 1st Viscount Monck. Together, they were the parents of eight children:

 Marcus Beresford, styled Lord Le Poer (1771–1783), who died young.
 Henry de la Poer, Beresford, 2nd Marquess of Waterford (1772–1826), politician who married Lady Susanna Hussey Carpenter, only daughter of George Carpenter, 2nd Earl of Tyrconnell, by his second wife Hon. Sarah Hussey Delaval (a younger daughter of John Delaval, 1st Baron Delaval), in 1805.
 Most Rev. Lord John George (1773–1862), Archbishop of Armagh.
 Lord George Thomas Beresford (1781–1839), politician who married Harriet Schutz, daughter of John Bacon Schutz, of Gillingham Hall, in 1808.
 Lady Isabella Anne Beresford (1776–1850), married Sir John William Head Brydges, MP, of Wootton Court, second son of Edward Brydges), in 1812.
 Lady Catharine Beresford (1777–1843)
 Lady Anne Beresford (1779–1842)
 Lady Elizabeth Louisa Beresford (1783–1856), who married Maj.-Gen. Sir Denis Pack in 1816. After his death in 1823, she married Sir Thomas Reynell, 6th Baronet, in 1831.

He also had two illegitimate sons, William Carr Beresford, 1st Viscount Beresford, and Sir John Beresford, 1st Baronet.

Lord Waterford died in 1800 and his titles passed to his eldest surviving legitimate son, Henry.

References

1735 births
1800 deaths
Politicians from County Waterford
Irish people of English descent
La Poer, George Beresford, Lord
La Poer, George Beresford, Lord
Knights of St Patrick
People educated at Kilkenny College
Members of the Privy Council of Ireland
George
1
Members of the Parliament of Ireland (pre-1801) for County Waterford constituencies
Members of the Parliament of Ireland (pre-1801) for County Londonderry constituencies
Peers of Great Britain created by George III